Şerife Perihan (born 14 June 1957), better known as Perihan Savaş, is a Turkish actress.

Personal life 
Savaş was born in Aksaray, Fatih. After finishing secondary school, she stopped her education. Her family is originally from Sürmene. After the age of five, she had her first acting experience by joining the Istanbul City Theatre and took part in children's play. At the age of thirteen, she got engaged to a twenty one year-old military school student. After a marriage that lasted for 6-7 months, the couple got divorced. On her childhood and her decision to become an actress, Savaş said:

She then married İbrahim Tatlıses and Yılmaz Zafer, respectively. She has two children, one from each of those marriages.

Career 
Until 1970, she worked on stage, taking part in plays such as Küçük Prenses, Romeo and Juliet, and Kibarlık Budalası. Savaş made her cinematic debut in 1971 with a role in the movie Şehzade Simbad Kaf Dağında. Soon she was cast in leading roles in a number of different movies. Throughout her career she has appeared in more than 120 films. Aside from her career as an actress, she also worked as a singer and TV presenter.

Filmography

TV series 

İyilik - 2022– (Şahika Arkun)
Elkızı - 2021–2022 (Cavidan Bozdağlı)
Menajerimi Ara - 2021 (herself - guest appearance)
Çukur - 2017–2021 (Sultan Koçovalı)
Girdap - 2016
Bedel - 2015
Osmanlı'da Derin Devlet - 2013
Sırat - 2011
Leyla ile Mecnun - 2011
Gazi - 2008
Kırmızı Işık - 2008
Eksik Etek - 2007
Yaprak Dökümü - 2006
Şarkılar Susmasın - 2006
Yanık Koza - 2005
Gece Yürüyüşü - 2004
Fırtına Hayatlar - 2004
Harput Güneşi - 2004
Kendini Bırak Gitsin - 2004
Büyük Buluşma - 2004
Umutların Ötesi - 2003
Kardelen - 2002
Yalanın Batsın - 2002
Sultan - 2001
Karakolda Ayna Var - 2000
Kimyacı - 2000
Ana Kuzusu - 1996
Sevda Kondu - 1996
Yarına Gülümsemek - 1991
El Kızı - 1989

Film 

Gerçek Kesit: Manyak - 2018
Kafalar Karışık - 2018
Gulyabani - 2014
Zaman Makinesi 1973 - 2014
Dursun Çavuş - 2013
Hop Dedik: Deli Dumrul - 2011
Takım: Vatan Sana Canım Feda - 2011
İstiklal: Söğütlü Hacer Ana - 2007   
Eve Dönüş - 2006
Kameranın Ardındaki Kadın: Bilge Olgaç - 2005
Çalınan Ceset - 2004  
Evlat - 2003      
Gelinlik Kız - 2000   
Savunma - 2000   
Köpekler Adası - 1996      
Gökkuşağı - 1995   
Sevdaların Ölümü - 1992   
Mahallenin Muhtarları - 1992      
Acılar Ve Arzular - 1991   
Kiralık Anne - 1990   
Oy Bebek - 1990
Minyeli Abdullah 2 - 1990
Zulüm Treni - 1989   
Bekleyiş - 1989   
Karılar Koğuşu - 1989      
Minyeli Abdullah - 1989      
Yaşarken Ölmek - 1988   
Arka Evin İnsanları - 1988   
Sapık Kadın - 1988     
Cennet Gözlüm - 1987   
Arkadaşım ve Ben - 1987   
Sis - 1987      
Toprağın Gelini - 1987   
Yarınsız Adam - 1987      
İpekçe - 1987
Sevgi Dünyası - 1987
Su - 1986      
Aşk ve Kin - 1986      
Hastahane - 1986   
Bir Daha Umut - 1986  
Kırlangıç Fırtınası - 1985      
Alkol - 1985 
Sosyete Şaban - 1985   
Keriz - 1985         
Güneş Doğarken - 1984   
Kaşık Düşmanı - 1984   
Yalan - 1982
Amansızlar - 1982  
Seni Yakacaklar - 1981   
Ayrılık Kolay Değil - 1980   
Yarabbim - 1980   
Çile - 1980      
Vah Başımıza Gelenler - 1979   
Fırat - 1979   
Kara Çadırın Kızı - 1979      
Kara Yazma - 1979      
Yuvasız Kuşlar - 1979      
Köşe Kapmaca - 1979      
Ölüm Görevi - 1978      
Çilekeş - 1978      
Lekeli Melek - 1978      
Yıkılış - 1978   
Kılıç Bey - 1978      
Şeref Sözü - 1977      
Sevgili Oğlum - 1977   
Silah Arkadaşları - 1977   
Satılmış Adam - 1977 
İki Kızgın Adam - 1976   
Silahlara Veda - 1976   
Perişan - 1976   
Sevdalılar - 1976      
Analar Ölmez - 1976   
Deli Kız - 1975   
İntihar - 1975      
Bitirimler Sınıfı - 1975   
Kader Yolcuları - 1975      
Beş Milyoncuk Borç Verir misin - 1975    
Çapkın Kızlar - 1975
Hostes - 1974      
Esir Hayat - 1974      
Sevmek - 1974   
Dertler Benim Olsun - 1974   
Taşralı Kız - 1974   
Gerçek - 1974   
Çılgın Arzular - 1974   
Evet mi Hayır mı - 1974      
Sensiz Yaşanmaz - 1974   
Zafer Kartalları - 1974   
Sezercik Küçük Mücahit - 1974      
Bedrana - 1974      
Gülerken Ağlayanlar - 1973   
Çaresizler - 1973   
Kızın Varsa Derdin Var - 1973   
Kuşçu - 1973      
Nefret - 1973   
Soğukkanlılar - 1973   
Yemin - 1973   
Yedi Evlat İki Damat - 1973      
Bebek Yüzlü - 1973      
Namus - 1972   
Malkoçoğlu Kurt Bey - 1972   
Sev Dedi Gözlerim - 1972   
Vur - 1972   
Korkusuz Beşler - 1972   
Aşka Selam Kavgaya Devam - 1972   
Atmaca Mehmet - 1972   
İyi Döverim Kötü Severim - 1972   
Katerina 72 - 1972   
Serseri Kral - 1972   
Para - 1972      
Kanlı Değirmen - 1972   
Şehzade Sinbad Kaf Dağında - 1971

TV programs 
 1993 - Gerçek Kesit
 2012 - Çay ve Sempati 
 2013 - Sağlıcakla
 2015 - Perihan'la Sağlıklı Ramazanlar

Theatre 
 Kanlı Nigar: Sadık Şendil - Adım Theatre, (2012)
 Yüzleşme: Arslan Kaçar - Istanbul City Theatre, (2011)
 Bozuk Düzen: Dinçer Sümer - Istanbul City Theatre, (2009)
 How the Other Half Loves: Alan Ayckbourn - Istanbul City Theatre, (2005)
 Yedi Kocalı Hürmüz: Sadık Şendil - Istanbul City Theatre, (2003)
 Huit femmes: Robert Thomas - Istanbul City Theatre - (2002)
 Bir Kış Öyküsü: Cevat Fehmi Başkut - Istanbul City Theatre - (2000)
 Cyrano de Bergerac: Edmond Rostand - Istanbul City Theatre - (1967)
 Kadın

Awards 
 1974: 11th Antalya Film Festival, Best Actress, Bedrana.

References

External links 
 
 

Living people
1957 births
Turkish stage actresses
Turkish film actresses
Turkish television actresses
Best Actress Golden Orange Award winners
Best Actress Golden Boll Award winners